The Way of a Girl is a 1925 American silent drama film starring Eleanor Boardman, Matt Moore, and William Russell. The film was directed by Robert G. Vignola, and the screenplay written by Albert S. Le Vino. It is based on a story by Katharine Newlin Burt.

The female lead, Eleanor Boardman, stars in one of the 11 movies she did for Metro-Goldwyn-Mayer in the first two years of the life of the studio.

Plot
As described in a film magazine review, overhearing her fiancé tell her father that he "knows all about handling girls," Rosamond decides to show him that he knows nothing about it. Her escapades land her in jail for speeding. Her fiancé rescues her from her sentence of ten days. Still headstrong in her belief that no man can subdue her, she recklessly drives over an embankment and is rescued by two criminals that are hiding in a cave. After escaping from what appears to be certain death, she is rescued and "tamed," admitting her submission.

Cast
Eleanor Boardman as Rosamond
Matt Moore as George
William Russell as Brand
Matthew Betz as Matt
Charles K. French as the Police Judge

References

External links

Still at silenthollywood.com

1925 films
Silent American drama films
American silent feature films
American black-and-white films
Metro-Goldwyn-Mayer films
1925 drama films
Films directed by Robert G. Vignola
Films based on works by Katharine Newlin Burt
1920s English-language films
1920s American films